Modo Island is a small island in Jindo County, South Jeolla province, South Korea, just off the southwest corner of the Korean peninsula. It is located to the south-east of Jindo Island and is about 1.1 km long and 300 meters wide.

The tide-related sea level variations result in a land pass 2.9 km long and 10–40 meters wide opening for approximately an hour between Modo and Jindo islands. The event occurs roughly twice a year, around April–June. It had long been celebrated in a local festival called "Jindo's Sea Way", but was largely unknown to the world until 1975, when the French ambassador Pierre Randi described the phenomenon in a French newspaper. Nowadays, nearly half a million foreign and local tourists attend the event annually. It is accompanied by local festivals which include Ganggangsuwollae (Korean traditional circle dance), Ssitkim-gut (a shaman ritual, consoling the souls of the dead), Deul Norae (traditional farmers' songs), Manga (burial ceremony songs), Jindo dog show, Buknori (drum performance) and fireworks.

References

External links 
 Satellite images of island and the "miracle road" (vague)
 County government home page

Islands of South Jeolla Province
Jindo County
Islands of the Yellow Sea
Tidal islands